Equus namadicus is a prehistoric equid, known from remains dating to the Middle and Late Pleistocene from across the Indian subcontinent, with its last dated records being approximately 29-14,000 years ago. It is considered a "stenonine horse", meaning that it is probably more closely related to zebras and asses than true horses. It is relatively large in size. It is very similar to the earlier Equus sivalensis, also from the Indian subcontinent, from which it only differs in size and in subtle aspects of dental anatomy, and it has sometimes been suggested to be a synonym of it.

References

B.J. MacFadden, Fossil Horses, 1992
J. Curke, A Roman Frontier Post and its People, The Fort of Newstead in the Parish of Melrose, Glasgow 1911 (appendix on animal remains )

Pleistocene horses
namadicus